is a Japanese football player who plays for Aventura Kawaguchi.

Club statistics
Updated to 23 February 2018.

References

External links

Profile at Machida Zelvia

1986 births
Living people
Association football people from Saitama Prefecture
Japanese footballers
J1 League players
J2 League players
J3 League players
Urawa Red Diamonds players
Shonan Bellmare players
FC Machida Zelvia players
Tochigi City FC players
Association football forwards